Ronald Brian Jacks (born January 23, 1948) was a Canadian Olympic and international swimmer in the 1960s and 1970s. He is currently a leading coach for Canadian swimmers such as Richard Weinberger through the Pacific Coast Swimming Club. 

He helped found the Pacific Coast Swimming club in 2002. He was National Open Water Coach of the Year in 2002, 2003 and 2004, a Paralympic Coach for the 2004 Athens Games and the Canadian Open Water Head Coach at the 2005 World Aquatic Championships in Montreal and 2006 Pan Pacific Championships in Victoria. Ron has produced finalists or semi-finalists at every Olympic Games 1976-2004, coached two Olympians to Bronze medals (Shannon Smith (swimmer) and Pam Rai), and coached two World Champion Open Water swimmers (Kim Dyke - 1993 Open Water World Cup Series Champion and Greg Streppel - 1994 World Open Water Champion). Ron is one of the very few coaches who has completed a hat trick at the International level, with medalists among able-bodied swimmers, swimmers with a disability, and open-water swimmers. He is a member of the Canadian Swimming, the BC Sports, and the Swimming Canada Halls of Fame.

Career

Swimming
At the 1966 British Empire and Commonwealth Games held in Kingston, Jamaica, he won a gold medal in the 110 yards butterfly. In the 1970 British Commonwealth Games in Edinburgh, Scotland, he won a bronze medal in the 100 metres butterfly. He also competed for Canada at the 1964 Summer Olympics in Tokyo, the 1968 Summer Olympics in Mexico City, and the 1972 Summer Olympics in Munich, and 1967 and 1971 Pan-Am Games.

Between 1964 and 1972 Jacks set seven Canadian records, and won numerous Canadian National Championships. As a club swimmer he trained with the Vancouver 'Y' swim club, under Canadian coach Ted Simpson. For his university swimming career he attended Indiana University from 1966 to 1972, training under James "Doc" Counsilman. He graduated with a Bachelor of Science degree in Zoology in 1971. He is a member of the Canadian Swimming Hall of Fame, the BC Sports Hall of Fame and the Swim BC Halls of Fame. He won the 1969 British 'Open' ASA National Championship 440 yards freestyle title and the 1650 yards freestyle title.

Coaching
In 1972, Jacks retired from competitive swimming and turned his attention to coaching starting in Vancouver, BC as the head coach for the Arbutus Swim Club.  Later founding the Vancouver Pacific Swim Club. Jacks became head coach with the Hyack Swim Club from 1974-1984 when he moved to Victoria, BC to become the head coach of the Victoria Amateur Swim Club. In 1988 he helped in the formation of Island Swimming, and held the position of Director of Swimming until 2002.  In 2002, he and fellow coaches Rod Barratt, and Mark Lancaster formed Pacific Coast Swimming where Ron is currently in the position of Director of Swimming.

Jacks is a Canadian NCCP Level IV and NCI Master Coach. He has received numerous recognitions for coaching excellence by Swim BC, the BC Swim Coaches Association, the Canadian Swim Coaches and Teachers Association, and Swim-Natation Canada. He was named as the National Open Water Coach of the Year in 2002, 2003, 2004 and 2005. In 2005 he was named the Swimming Canada National Open Water Head Coach.

Jacks received a National Domestic Excellence in Coaching Award in 2003 and 2004, a Petro-Canada National Coaching Excellence Award in 2004, and a 2004 International CSCTA Team Award. He was also awarded the 2004 and 2005 BC Coach of the Year (SWAD), and the 2002 BC Coach of the Year (16 and under age group).

Jacks coaching has produced finalists or semi-finalists at every Olympic Games since 1976.

A partial list of Jacks' athletes accomplishments
Olympians Bronze medals - Shannon Smith, Pam Rai and, Rivhard Weinberger
World Champion Open Water swimmers: Kim Dyke, 1993 Open Water World Cup Series Champion, Greg Streppel - 1994 World Open Water Champion;
Paralympic Gold Medalist/World Record Holder: Stephanie Dixon;
Olympic Finalists: Christin Petelski (1996, 2000), Nikki Dryden,  and Jon Kelly;
Commonwealth Games athletes: Danielle Bell, John Stamhuis, Philip Weiss, Suzanne Weckend, Dino Verbrugge and Anne Barnes;
FINA Open Water Championship competitor: David Creel, Karley Stutzel, Richard Weinberger.

See also
 List of Commonwealth Games medallists in swimming (men)

References

External links

1948 births
Living people
Canadian male butterfly swimmers
Canadian male freestyle swimmers
Canadian swimming coaches
Commonwealth Games gold medallists for Canada
Commonwealth Games silver medallists for Canada
Commonwealth Games bronze medallists for Canada
Indiana Hoosiers men's swimmers
Olympic swimmers of Canada
Pan American Games silver medalists for Canada
Swimmers from Winnipeg
Swimmers at the 1964 Summer Olympics
Swimmers at the 1966 British Empire and Commonwealth Games
Swimmers at the 1967 Pan American Games
Swimmers at the 1968 Summer Olympics
Swimmers at the 1970 British Commonwealth Games
Swimmers at the 1971 Pan American Games
Swimmers at the 1972 Summer Olympics
Commonwealth Games medallists in swimming
Pan American Games medalists in swimming
Medalists at the 1967 Pan American Games
Medalists at the 1971 Pan American Games
Medallists at the 1966 British Empire and Commonwealth Games
Medallists at the 1970 British Commonwealth Games